The following is a list of awards and nominations received by British actress Rachel Weisz who is known for roles on the stage and screen.

She has received two Academy Award nominations winning Best Supporting Actress for her role in Fernando Meirelles The Constant Gardener (2005). She received her second Academy Award nomination for her performance in the Yorgos Lanthimos period comedy The Favourite (2019). Weisz also received a British Academy Film Award for Best Film Actress in a Supporting Role for her role in The Favourite. She has received three Golden Globe Award nominations and two Golden Globe Award nominations winning both for The Constant Gardener (2005). For her work in theatre, she received the Laurence Olivier Award for Best Actress in a Play for her leading performance as Blanche Dubois in the revival production of the Tennessee Williams' play A Streetcar Named Desire in 2010. Weisz made her Broadway debut in the revival of the Harold Pinter play Betrayal alongside her husband Daniel Craig in 2013.

Major associations

Academy Awards

British Academy Film Awards

Golden Globe Awards

Screen Actors Guild Awards

Industry and Critics Awards

British Independent Film Awards

Critics' Choice Movie Awards

European Film Awards

New York Film Critics Circle

Theatre awards

Laurence Olivier Awards

References 

Weisz, Rachel